Lucy in the Sky is a 2019 American psychological drama film loosely inspired by the life of NASA astronaut Lisa Nowak, who is portrayed by Natalie Portman. The film was directed, co-produced, and co-written by Noah Hawley in his feature directorial debut. In addition to Portman, the film stars Jon Hamm, Zazie Beetz, Dan Stevens, Colman Domingo, and Ellen Burstyn.

Lucy in the Sky had its world premiere at the 44th Toronto International Film Festival on September 11, 2019, and was theatrically released in the United States by Fox Searchlight Pictures on October 4, 2019. The film received negative reviews from critics and was a box-office bomb, grossing a mere $325,950 against its $21.4 million budget.

Plot
Astronaut Lucy Cola is left awestruck from her first mission in outer space. Upon returning to Earth, she immediately feels disconnected from her normal life with her husband and niece. Although required to undergo NASA therapy and recommended to rest, Lucy begins pushing herself physically and mentally in order to return to space on the next available mission. During training, Lucy encounters a younger female astronaut named Erin. Bored by and frustrated with her supportive husband, Lucy begins spending time with other astronauts who have been to space, eventually beginning an affair with one named Mark.

Determined to beat a record recently set by Erin, Lucy nearly drowns during an underwater test, but remains completely calm with her heartbeat actually growing calmer. Later it is discovered that Mark is also having an affair with Erin, leaving Lucy feeling increasingly isolated from her husband. Refusing to be beaten, Lucy pushes to escalate her affair and demands that Mark cease his relationship with Erin. Lucy's beloved grandmother dies of a stroke, an event that leaves Lucy deeply distressed and causing her husband to be increasingly concerned by her erratic behavior. Breaking down after the funeral, Lucy walks out on her husband, with her teenage niece in tow. She cries in a public restroom at a bowling alley and asks, "Is this as good as it gets?"

NASA administration confronts Lucy with her near drowning (as well as evidence that she has been blowing off therapy) and tells her she is being passed over for the role in the upcoming mission. Despite promises that she can qualify for the following mission in three years' time, Lucy becomes furious and paranoid that she has been passed over for ulterior reasons. Breaking into Mark's computer, Lucy finds emails showing both that he has continued his affair with Erin, as well as correspondence from Mark urging NASA that Lucy be passed over. Her paranoia is confirmed when Lucy finds that Erin has been selected for the mission.

With her grip on reality now completely unraveling, Lucy decides to take revenge on Mark and Erin. Lucy and her niece embark on a cross country trip. Along the way, she experiences hallucinations of her grandmother and leaves emotionally erratic messages for NASA. Wearing a wig, Lucy storms into an airport where Mark and Erin are located. Following Mark to his car, Lucy tearfully confronts him, but is stopped when Erin appears. Lucy sprays insect spray into Mark's face and Mark speeds off in his car. Lucy completely breaks down and is apprehended by the police while attempting to flee. An assortment of weapons and tools are discovered in her car.

Three years later, Lucy's niece is giving a presentation in class, with Lucy's husband in attendance. Lucy is working as a beekeeper; she closes one of the hives, then opens the hood of her protective suit, smiling momentarily at the bees and one butterfly flying around her.

Cast
 Natalie Portman as Lucy Cola
 Jon Hamm as Mark Goodwin
 Zazie Beetz as Erin Eccles
 Dan Stevens as Drew Cola
 Colman Domingo as Frank Paxton
 Ellen Burstyn as Nana Holbrook
 Pearl Amanda Dickson as Blue Iris
 Jeremiah Birkett as Hank Lynch
 Joe Williamson as Mayer Hines
 Nick Offerman as Dr. Will Plimpton
 Tig Notaro as Kate Mounier
 Jeffrey Donovan as Jim Hunt

Production
In February 2017, Noah Hawley was brought onto the project, then known as Pale Blue Dot, to produce alongside Bruna Papandrea and Reese Witherspoon, with Witherspoon intended to star in the lead role. However, in November 2017, Witherspoon dropped out of the film in order to shoot a second season of Big Little Lies.

By January 2018, Hawley was also set to direct the film, while Natalie Portman entered into negotiations for the lead role. The film is Hawley's feature film directorial debut, and derives its title from the Beatles song "Lucy in the Sky with Diamonds". In March 2018, Jon Hamm joined the cast. In April 2018, Zazie Beetz joined the cast, with Dan Stevens joining in May. In June 2018, Ellen Burstyn joined the cast to portray the grandmother of Portman's character. In July 2018, Colman Domingo and Jeremiah Birkett joined the cast of the film. In February 2019, it was announced Nick Offerman had been cast in the film.

Filming began in June 2018.

Release
The film had its world premiere at the 2019 Toronto International Film Festival on September 11, 2019. It was released on October 4, 2019.

Reception

Box office 
The film made $55,000 from 37 theaters in its opening weekend, which was described as "terrible".

Critical response 
The site's critics consensus reads, "Natalie Portman gives it her all, but it isn't enough to overcome Lucy in the Skys confused approach to its jumbled story." On Metacritic, the film has a weighted average score of 36 out of 100, based on 36 critics, indicating "generally unfavorable reviews".

At the 46th Saturn Awards, the film earned three nominations: Best Science Fiction Film, Best Actress for Portman, and Best Supporting Actress for Burstyn.

Controversy
In November 2018, retired astronaut Marsha Ivins, who flew five missions, criticized the premise of the plot and denied that there is such a thing as a "longstanding idea that says astronauts begin to lose their grip on reality after being in space for an extended period of time". Following its premiere at the 2019 Toronto International Film Festival, multiple media outlets, some jokingly, criticized the film for failing to include the more salacious elements of Nowak's real-life case, in particular, her use of adult diapers.

References

External links
 
 
 

2010s science fiction drama films
2019 directorial debut films
2019 drama films
2019 films
2019 science fiction films
American films based on actual events
American science fiction drama films
Drama films based on actual events
Films about adultery in the United States
Films about astronauts
Films directed by Noah Hawley
Films with screenplays by Noah Hawley
Films produced by Noah Hawley
Films produced by Reese Witherspoon
Films scored by Jeff Russo
Films shot in Los Angeles
Fox Searchlight Pictures films
TSG Entertainment films
2010s English-language films
2010s American films